Adalia bipunctata,  the two-spot ladybird, two-spotted ladybug or two-spotted lady beetle, is a carnivorous beetle of the family Coccinellidae that is found throughout the holarctic region. It is very common in western and central Europe. It is also native to North America but it has heavily declined in many states and provinces. It is commonly introduced and imported as a biological control agent.

Taxonomy
The two-spotted ladybird was one of the many species originally described by Carl Linnaeus in his 1758 10th edition of Systema Naturae; its original name was Coccinella bipunctata. Its specific name is from the Latin bi- "two", and punctata "spotted".

Description
Adalia bipunctata is a small Coccinellid that can feature any one of a large selection of red and black forms. Some forms are similar to Mulsantina picta, but the two white spots on the head of Adalia (in contrast with a large white region or more than two spots) readily separate it. Additionally Adalia is entirely black on the ventral surface with black legs, which helps rule out any other options.

The two-spotted ladybird is highly variable in many parts of its native range. The most familiar form, form typica with two black spots on a red base, is common throughout. A melanistic form that is black with four or six red spots is uncommon, but not rare, while the truly melanistic form purpurea is exceedingly rare. In North America the species shows the most variation, with several forms that do not occur elsewhere including a spotless form, a four-banded form, a nine to twelve spotted form, and a "cross-hatched" form. In addition, there are intermediate forms such as form annulata, but they occur rarely.

Prey
Two-spotted lady beetles feed on aphids and other small insects. However, the sterile soldiers within colonies of aphids such as the gall-forming Pemphigus spyrothecae, can attempt to protect the aphid colony by fighting this species.

Life cycle
The two-spotted lady beetle's life cycle starts with eggs that are usually laid in clutches. The larva hatches from the egg by biting a hole in it. The larva looks very different from an adult; it has an elongated, grey, soft body with six legs but no wings. They are cannibalistic. A larva goes through four larval stages: by eating it grows and at some point it sheds its old skin and appears in a new one in which it can grow more. The last larval stage is approximately the size of an adult beetle. Once it has eaten enough, the larva attaches itself to a substrate and moults into a pupa. Inside the pupa, the adult develops. Finally the adult ecloses from the pupa.

Sex ratio anomalies

Symbiosis
In some populations, the majority of the beetles are female. In these populations, 80-90% of the offspring are female. The cause of this anomaly is the presence of symbiotic bacteria living within the gametic cells of the female lady beetles. The bacterium is too large to live in the male gametes (sperm), so the bacterium can be transmitted to the next generation only through female gametes. When it ends up in a male, it will die when the male dies. Therefore, it kills most of the male embryos in the newly laid eggs. These dead embryos then serve as food for their sisters when they emerge from their eggs. This trait is associated with a variety of bacteria (Wolbachia, Rickettsia, and Spiroplasma) which are present in between 0 and 20% of females, depending on locality.

Parasitism
The two-spot ladybird also carries a sexually transmitted infection in Central and Eastern Europe. The infection is an ectoparasitic mite Coccipolipus hippodamiae that transfers between male and female (and female and male) during copulation. The infection sterilizes female two-spot ladybirds, and at some points of the year, up to 90% of adult two spots become infected.

As biological control agent
A. bipunctata is used as a localised biological control agent against aphids in, for example, greenhouses.. The two-spotted lady beetle was introduced into Australia specifically as a biological control agent.

References

External links

Biological pest control beetles
Insects used as insect pest control agents
Beetles of New Zealand
Coccinellidae
Beetles described in 1758
Taxa named by Carl Linnaeus
National symbols of Latvia